is a Japanese manga series written and illustrated by Yōko Maki, author of Aishiteruze Baby. The series first ran in the February 2007 issue of Ribon.

Plot 
Hotate is a ten-year-old girl with a unique gift: she can see and communicate with the spirits of those who have died. After the death of her mother, young Hotate is living with her grandmother. The old woman grows wary of Hotate's special ability and Hotate is placed in the care of a man who is introduced as her uncle - Zenjirou Yamamoto. Moving to her uncle's farm, Hotate settles in with her new housemates, Bess the cow and a university student paying board called Makoto. But... What is the secret relationship between Hotate and Zenjirou Yamamoto? 
Follow Hotate as she uses her gift to help both the departed and the living in this series by Yoko Maki.

Characters
 Yamamoto Hotate: Her entire life she was able to see spirits. Her grandmother then sent her to live with her father. It's not really stated, but she has some kinds of feelings for Hayami and Yuuki. She is the daughter of Yamamoto Zenjirou, while having a deceased mother whose spirit she can see every once in a while.
 Yamamoto Zenjirou: He's the young looking father of Hotate. He lives high in the mountains and hid the fact that he could see ghosts from his daughter, until she found out herself in one of the later chapters of volume 2. He cares for Hotate.
 Makoto: A university student paying board to live with Zenjiro and Hotate. He falls in love with a girl from his university who turns out to be the mother of Chi-chan. She later lives with Zenjiro and Hotate as well and they have a romantic relationship.
 Hayami: The spirit of a helpful boy who can only be seen by Hotate. It's not clear if he likes Hotate, but there are some strong feelings for her (like every time she's with Yuuki, he acts all jealous). He's still alive, but in a coma. Hayami promise Hotate that he will come and see her one day. In reality, Hayami is already 14 years old and he doesn't want to wake up yet.
 Megu: Hotate's ditzy home-room teacher who has crush on Yamamoto Zenjirou. She loves kids and is a good teacher. Yamamoto Zenjirou has interest in her.
 Yuuki: A classmate of Hotate's from school who often teases her. Has a deceased grandfather who had a dog named Bike, who has also passed on. He acts tough and cool a lot, and he tends to fight with Hotate's good friend and classmate, Tsubasa. 
 Chi-chan: Ume's unborn baby. He ask Hotate to find his mother who sang him a lullaby. Later he tells Hotate that Makoto will be his next father.
 Tsubasa: She is Hotate's closest friend from school. She is kind and thoughtful and tends to fight with Yuuki a lot.
 Ume: Ume is Makoto's classmate in the university, and Chi's mother. She's popular in his school because of her looks, and personality. Makoto falls in love with her later in the series. It is also revealed that she got pregnant in her high school days in the past, but decided to abort it.

External links
 Ribon Waku-Waku Station Ribon Official website 
 Spirit Haven Fansite for Yoko Maki's Yamamoto Zenjirou to Moushimasu

2007 manga